Jean-Pierre Perrinelle (6 July 1949 – 30 August 2014) was a French hurdler. He competed in the 400 metres hurdles at the 1972 Summer Olympics and the 1976 Summer Olympics.

References

External links
 

1949 births
2014 deaths
Athletes (track and field) at the 1972 Summer Olympics
Athletes (track and field) at the 1976 Summer Olympics
French male hurdlers
Olympic athletes of France
Place of birth missing
20th-century French people
21st-century French people